"Don't Take The Girl" is a song written by Craig Martin and Larry W. Johnson, and recorded by American country music artist Tim McGraw.  It was released in March 1994 as the second single from his album Not a Moment Too Soon.  The song was McGraw's fifth single overall, and his first number-one single on the Hot Country Songs chart. It reached number one on the Canadian country charts as well and it was also a successful pop song, reaching number 17 on the Billboard Hot 100.

Content
The song tells the story of two young lovers dealing with difficult scenarios at three different stages in their lives. In each situation, the man does all he can to make sure that different entities "don't take the girl."

In the first verse, the young man (Johnny) is eight years old, about to go on a fishing trip with his father. A young, unnamed girl, apparently Johnny's age, is also present, with a fishing pole in her hand. Johnny doesn't want the girl to come fishing with them. So he begs his father to "take any boy in the world / Daddy, please, don't take the girl".

The song's second verse finds Johnny and the girl ten years later, now as teenagers. The two have since fallen in love and are now dating. As Johnny and his girlfriend are on a date at the "picture show" (i.e., the movie theater), they encounter a stranger with a gun. The man grabs the girl's arm and tells Johnny to give in to his demands. Johnny surrenders his money, wallet, credit cards, a watch that his grandfather gave him, and even his car keys so that the girl would be safe (in the music video, the crook's seen running away with only the wallet).

Verse three takes place five years after the second verse. At this point, Johnny and the girl are now (presumably) married and expecting their first child, and the girl is eventually rushed to the hospital to have her baby delivered. The baby, a boy, is safely delivered, but the doctor informs Johnny that his wife is "fading fast" (presumably dying from childbirth complications). Johnny then collapses to his knees and prays to God that his wife survives, even asking that his own life be taken instead of his wife's, as long as she's okay.

The song ends with a repeat of the song's opening line: "Johnny's daddy was taking him fishin' when he was eight years old".

Critical reception
Deborah Evans Price, of Billboard magazine reviewed the song favorably, saying that the song has the listeners "crying in their beer in the dancehalls down in Texas." Price continues to say that once radio gets a hold of it, the song will take off.

Southern sports personality Brandon Walker included the song as his top country hit of the 1990s.

Music video
The video was directed by Sherman Halsey. It shows 5 actors, playing Johnny, his dad, the girl, the robber & the doctor. Intercut with McGraw, performing in front of dark blue lights. The video was played on CMT and GAC

Charts and certifications
"Don't Take the Girl" debuted at number 17 on the U.S. Billboard Hot Country Singles & Tracks for the week of April 2, 1994.

Peak positions

End of year charts

Certifications

Parodies
Country music parodist Cledus T. Judd recorded a parody of the song, called "Please Take the Girl", on his 1995 debut album Cledus T. Judd (No Relation).

References

1994 singles
1994 songs
Tim McGraw songs
Song recordings produced by Byron Gallimore
Song recordings produced by James Stroud
Country ballads
Music videos directed by Sherman Halsey
Curb Records singles